Polish Historical Society (PTH) is a Polish professional scientific society for historians.

History
Founded in 1886 in Lwów by Ksawery Liske as a local society, in 1926 it became the Poland-wide organization dedicated to advancing the knowledge and studies in history of Poland. Since 1974 it has been organizing tournaments of historical knowledge and since 1980 has been organizing academic conferences at five year intervals. It has 46 local chapters, 8 committees and over 3,000 members. Since 2005, it has had a status of a public benefit organization under Polish law.

The Polish Historical Society publishes a number of scientific journals such as Małopolskie Studia Historyczne, Rocznik Kaliski, Rocznik Łódzki, Rocznik Lubelski and Biuletyn Polskiego Towarzystwa Historycznego.

Presidents of the Polish Historical Society
Ksawery Liske (1886-1891)
Tadeusz Wojciechowski (1891-1914)
Ludwik Finkel (1914-1923)
Stanisław Zakrzewski (1923-1932 and 1934-1936)
Franciszek Bujak (1932-1934 and 1936-1937)
Ludwik Kolankowski (1937-1947)
Władysław Konopczyński (1947)
Jan Dąbrowski (1947-1950)
Tadeusz Manteuffel (1950-1953)
Natalia Gąsiorowska (1953-1956)
Stanisław Herbst (1956-1973)
Marian Biskup (1973-1978)
Henryk Samsonowicz (1978-1982)
Andrzej Zahorski (1982-1988)
Andrzej Ajnenkiel (1988-1991)
Jacek Staszewski (1991-1997)
Wojciech Wrzesiński (1997-2003)
Krzysztof Mikulski (2003-2013)
Jan Szymczak (2013-2015)
Krzysztof Mikulski (2015-)

See also
History of Poland
Timeline of Polish history

References

Historical societies
Learned societies of Poland
Organizations established in 1886
1886 establishments in Poland
History organisations based in Poland